James, Jim, Jimmy and Jamie Bell may refer to:

Arts and entertainment
James Bell (actor) (1891–1973), American character actor
James Madison Bell (1826–1902), African-American poet, orator, and political activist
Jamie Bell (born 1986), English actor
Jimmy Velvit (born 1941), US singer who used the pseudonym James Bell

Business 
James Bell (merchant) (c. 1739–1814), Scottish-born merchant in Canada
James Ford Bell (1879–1961), American entrepreneur; founder of General Mills
James George Bell (1831–1911), American settler and businessman
James A. Bell (born 1948), American business executive; Boeing Chief Financial Officer

Military
James Bell (Medal of Honor) (1845–1901), American; US Army private
James B. Bell (1835–1910), American soldier and Medal of Honor recipient
J. Franklin Bell (1856–1919), Chief of Staff of the United States Army

Politicians and government officials 
James Bell (Australian politician) (1836–1908), Australian businessman and politician, Victorian Legislative Council member 1880–1904
James Bell (New Hampshire politician) (1805–1857), American; U.S. Senator
Sir James Bell (town clerk) (1866–1937), Town Clerk of London, 1902–1935
James Bell (trade unionist) (1872–1955), English Labour MP for Ormskirk
James A. Bell (New York politician) (1814–?), New York politician
James F. Bell (judge) (1915–2005), Democratic lawyer and judge of the Ohio Supreme Court
James H. Bell (1825–1892), Justice of the Supreme Court of Texas
James M. Bell (1878–1953), Iowa state legislator and mayor
James Martin Bell (1796–1849), American; U.S. Congressman
James Spencer-Bell (1818–1872), known until 1866 as James Bell, MP for Guildford
Sir James Bell, 1st Baronet (1850–1929), Scottish shipowner and yachtsman, Lord Provost of Glasgow 1892 to 1896

Religion
James Bell (bishop) (born 1950), English clergyman
James Bell (priest) (1524–1584), Catholic martyr
James Bell (reformer) (died 1596), English Reformer

Science
James Bell (chemist) (1825–1908), Irish chemist
James F. Bell III (born 1965), American scientist
James Mackintosh Bell (1877–1934), New Zealand geologist, writer and company director

Sport 
Cool Papa Bell (James Thomas Bell, 1903–1991), American baseball player
James Bell (Australian footballer) (born 1999), Australian rules footballer (Sydney Swans)
James Bell (basketball) (born 1992), American basketball player
James Bell (footballer, born 1866) (1866–?), Scottish footballer (Dumbarton, Celtic and Kilmarnock)
James Bell (footballer, born 1883) (1883–1962), Middlesbrough, Portsmouth and Exeter City player
James Bell (rugby league) (born 1994), New Zealand rugby league footballer
Jay Bell (footballer) (James Bell, born 1989), English footballer 
Jim Bell (footballer) (1935–2019), footballer who represented New Zealand
Jim Bell (ice hockey), American ice hockey player and head coach

Others 
James Bell (geographical writer) (1769–1833), Scottish geographical writer
James Stanislaus Bell (1797–1858), British adventurer in Circassia
Jim Bell (born 1958), American crypto-anarchist
J. Carleton Bell (1872–1946), American educational psychologist and professor of education
James Bell, character in Pure Genius
James "Jim" Bell, character in Friday Night Dinner

See also
James Bell Pettigrew (1832–1908), Scottish anatomist
Bell (surname)